Narborough Road is a street in the British city of Leicester. In February 2016, it was named the UK's "most diverse" road in a research project by the London School of Economics (LSE).

History

Narborough Road is a 1.5 mile (2.4 km)-long road in the south-west of Leicester. It stretches from Braunstone Lane in the south to Hinckley Road in the north, and is located in Westcotes, a ward of Leicester with a population of 11,644. It is one of the main roads leading from the M1 motorway to the city centre. According to the 2015 Index of Multiple Deprivation, Narborough Road is located within areas that are among the 10–20% most deprived in England.

Narborough Road was previously the main route from Leicester to the nearby city of Coventry. In 1485, Richard III rode south down the street towards Market Bosworth for the Battle of Bosworth against Henry Tudor; the street was crowded with people wanting to see him and cheer him off. After Richard lost the battle, his naked body was put on a horse and ridden back along the same route. In the mid-20th century, Narborough Road was closer to being a residential area; it then became a fashion street, with its retail units mainly selling clothes and fabrics. The opening of a number of restaurants and bars brought in students from the city's two universities, University of Leicester and De Montfort University. , 204 of the 222 units along the street (92%) are non-residential.

Diversity
In 2015, a research project titled "Super Diverse Streets", funded by the Economic and Social Research Council (ESRC), was undertaken by the LSE. Led by urban ethnographer Suzanne Hall, the project sought to "explore how urban retail economies and spaces are shaped by and shape migrant practices". Four streets were selected to be studied by the project: Rookery Road in Birmingham, Stapleton Road in Bristol, Cheetham Hill in Manchester, and Narborough Road. These four streets were selected for their ethnic diversity and their deprived urban locale. After surveying a sample of shopkeepers from each of the four streets, the project concluded that Narborough Road's 108 surveyed proprietors came from a total of 22 countries of birth, over four continents. The street was thus named the most diverse in the UK.

The sampled shopkeepers observed that the ethnic make-up of the street had changed quickly. Tajinder Reehal, a Kenyan-born owner of an accessories shop, remarked: "I've seen the street change in the past 16 years. ... It's much more vibrant." Hairdresser Dipak Maru, also Kenyan-born, agreed, and felt that "in the last ten years [the road has] become lively and vibrant". The researchers observed that, despite its high levels of economic deprivation, the high levels of diversity in the street had enabled business owners to trade skills with one another – for example, a Canadian couple who ran a book shop helped others with filling in forms in exchange for a free meal or a free haircut. Speaking about the street's community, half-English, half-Polish music shop owner Lloyd Wright noted: "There's no tension. It's a very relaxed atmosphere."

As a result of the conclusions of the project, in July 2016 the TV channel Channel 4 invited some of the shopkeepers of Narborough Road to provide voiceovers for announcements for their programmes. A total of 21 residents and shopkeepers were invited to provide announcements, which took four days to record. These announcements were broadcast on Channel 4 during the week beginning 23 July.

References
Footnotes

Sources

Multiculturalism in the United Kingdom
Roads in Leicester
Streets in England